Two Cowboys was a short-lived Italian Eurodance project known for their hit single "Everybody Gonfi-Gon". The group was composed of Maurizio Braccagni and Roberto Gallo Salsotto.

Discography

Singles

Remixes

References

Italian Eurodance groups
Italian musical duos
Musical groups established in 1994
Musical groups disestablished in 2000
Musical groups from Milan